Frankie McLaren and George McLaren (born in 1997 in Lewisham) are English twin actors, known for Hereafter (2010), a film directed by Clint Eastwood, and a minor role in one episode of the series Casualty (2011).

Filmography

Awards and nominations

Notes

External links
 
 

21st-century English male actors
English male child actors
English male film actors
English male television actors
Living people
1997 births
Twin male actors
English twins
Male actors from London